Bayview station may refer to:
 Bayview station (Ottawa), an LRT station in Ottawa, Ontario, Canada
 Bayview station (Toronto), a Toronto subway station in Ontario, Canada
 Palms station, formerly Bay View station, a Los Angeles Metro Rail station in California, United States